Yavşan is a village in the İdil District of Şırnak Province in Turkey. The village is populated by Kurds of the Elîkan tribe and had a population of 1,060 in 2021.

The two hamlets of Doğanlar and Yukarıyavşan are attached to the village.

References 

Villages in İdil District
Kurdish settlements in Şırnak Province